The 1924 Louisiana gubernatorial election was held in two rounds on January 15 and February 19, 1924.  Like most Southern states between the Reconstruction Era and the Civil Rights Movement, Louisiana's Republican Party was virtually nonexistent in terms of electoral support.   This meant that the two Democratic Party primaries held on these dates were the real contest over who would be governor.  The 1924 election saw Henry L. Fuqua defeat Hewitt Bouanchaud to become Governor of Louisiana, and saw the beginning of the political rise of Huey P. Long Jr., who came in a surprisingly strong third.

Candidates 
Henry L. Fuqua of Baton Rouge, the manager of Louisiana State Penitentiary, had the support of former governors Jared Y. Sanders and Ruffin G. Pleasant, and of the Regular Democratic Organization, a powerful New Orleans-based political machine.  He also received funding from the oil industry.

Hewitt Bouanchaud, a French-speaking lawyer from Pointe Coupee Parish, was the handpicked candidate of outgoing governor John M. Parker.

Huey Long, an ambitious young Railroad Commissioner from Winnfield, had announced his intention to run for governor as early as 1922.

Campaign 
The major emerging issue of the campaign was the Ku Klux Klan, which had surged in popularity across the state in the early 1920s.  Long was reluctant to address the issue; his political support was strongest in Protestant north Louisiana, the heartland of the Klan.   A strong condemnation of the Klan would alienate many of these supporters.  Long ducked this issue, instead arguing that Standard Oil and corporate domination was the true threat to Louisiana.  Long was not affiliated with the Klan, but his defensiveness cast doubts among some voters.  Fuqua favored an antimasking law to combat the Klan, but did not take a strong stance on the issue.  Bouanchaud, a Catholic, made a strong denunciation of the Klan his main campaign issue.

Without the organized support enjoyed by his two opponents, Long built his campaign around printed circulars and frequent campaign stops in rural areas of the state.  He campaigned for increased educational funding, road improvement, and the right of unions to organize.  He condemned the concentration of wealth and the domination of large corporations over the state, arguing they needed to pay their fair share of taxes.  Long's opponents called him a radical demagogue with "Bolshevistic tendencies."

Results 
First Democratic Primary – January 15, 1924

Bouanchaud ran strongest in rural southern Louisiana, where Catholic voters were attracted to his French background and his strong anti-Klan position.  Fuqua's strongest vote came from the cities.  The real surprise of the election was Long's unexpectedly strong showing; he won all but three parishes in northern and central Louisiana.

Second Democratic Primary – February 19, 1924

Even though Long refused to endorse either candidate, most of his supporters went to Fuqua in the runoff.

General Election – April 22, 1924

Sources 

Compilation of Primary Election Returns of the Democratic Party, State of Louisiana.  1924.

Williams, T. Harry.  Huey Long.  Knopf, 1969.

1924
Gubernatorial
Louisiana
January 1924 events
February 1924 events